David Banney is an Australian conductor, composer and music educator. He is the Director of Music at Christ Church Cathedral (Newcastle), Artistic Director of the Newcastle Music Festival, the Artistic Director of the Christ Church Camerata, and Co-Director of the Newcastle Cathedral College of Music.

Conducting

David is the Director of Music at Christ Church Cathedral (Newcastle), and the Artistic Director of the Christ Church Camerata. He won the ABC Young Conductor of the Year Award in 1995. He has conducted orchestras and ensembles including the Queensland Symphony, Queensland Philharmonic, Opera Queensland, Queensland Ballet, Adelaide Symphony and the West Australian Symphony. He has worked extensively with youth orchestras, including QYOI and QYOII, the European and British Isles Medical Students Orchestras, the Sydney Youth Philharmonic and the Newcastle Strings. He has performed in the British Isles, Germany, Poland, Hungary, the Czech Republic, Portugal and Spain.

Composition

As a composer David has written for orchestra, chamber ensembles and choirs. A past winner of the ABC Young Composers Composition, his music has been performed throughout Australia, by performers including the Queensland and Adelaide Symphony Orchestra, the Omega Ensemble, the Christ Church Camerata (Newcastle), David Drury (organ), William Barton (didgeridoo), Andrew Blanch (guitar), Chris Moore (viola), Susan Collins (violin), Peter Guy (organ) and the Choir of Christ Church Cathedral (Newcastle).

Symmetry

In 2015 David completed a PhD entitled 'Symmetry and Symmetry Breaking in Music'. His research has built a musical paradigm based on the tension between symmetry and symmetry breaks in music, both in rhythm and harmony. He has collaborated with other scholars for symmetry research, publishing with Giuseppe Caglioti on the subject of thermodynamics in music, and with Roger Smith on the subject of symmetry breaking in the synchronisation of uterine muscle behaviour during human labour. In 2018 he was appointed Conjoint Senior Lecturer in Mathematics at the University of Newcastle, where he devised and presented the course 'Bach, Einstein and the Taj Mahal: Symmetry for Everyone'. David is the CEO of the International Symmetry Association.

List of significant compositions

Orchestra

In Memoriam PM (two violins and strings)

Images (string orchestra)

La Folia (string orchestra)

Australian Folk Song Suite (string orchestra)

English Folk Song Suite (string orchestra)

Three Chorale Preludes (string orchestra)

Violin Concertino No 1 (violin and strings)

Gypsy Suite (violin and strings)

Whale Song (didgeridoo and strings)

Luminescence (symphony orchestra)

Japanese Pictures (symphonic orchestra) Commissioned by the NSW Doctors Orchestra.

Czech Suite (symphony orchestra)

Prelude, Lament and Dance (two cellos and strings)

Celebration (symphony orchestra)

Choir

Tigers and Teapots. Folksong arrangements for unison treble voices and strings.

Missa Pace (SATB, organ, strings) Commissioned by the Newcastle Music Festival.

Mass for One (soprano/tenor and organ)

Mass for Another One (soprano, violin and organ)

Mass for Christ the King (sopranos/trebles and string quintet)

Mass for Trebles (trebles/sopranos, cello and organ)

Missa Pentatonica (unision voices and organ)

Newcastle Mass (SAB and organ)

Anniversary Mass (congregational setting)

St Nicholas Mass (SATB and organ or strings)

St Nicholas Canticles (SATB and organ or strings)

Christ Church Canticles (SATB and organ)

Canticles in Faux-bourdon (TTBB)

Nunc dimittis (SAB and organ)

Preces and Responses (SATB)

Benediction (SATB and cello)

Little Lamb (unison voices and piano)

Chamber Music

Nowhere Else To Go (cello and piano). Commissioned by Elizabeth Seysener.

Meditation (cello and piano)

String Quartet

Taking Flight (guitar and string quartet)

Strong Woman Dreaming (didgeridoo, piano and string quartet)

Pictures (violin and piano)

Three Psalms (flute and mezzo soprano) Commissioned by Sally Walker.

Ten Meditations for Lent and Easter (piano)

17 Violin Duos

Oriental Suite (violin and piano)

Violin Concertino No 2 (violin and piano)

Nocturne (piano solo)

Triste (cello and piano)

Film music

Understanding Stillbirth (documentary by Hunter Medical Research Institute)

The Heart is Like an Orchestra, the Uterus is Like a Football Crowd (documentary by Hunter Medical Research Institute)

Touch the Sky - Spitfire Memories (RAAF, Newcastle)

''Early Music"

Concerto à la Telemann (two violas and strings)

Concerto à la Handel (two violas and strings)

Sonata à la Franz (viola and piano)

Scherzo à la Felix (violin, viola, cello)

Trio à la Haydn (violin, viola, cello)

Seven Fugues - A, b, C, D, e, F and G (violin, viola, cello)

Six Contredanses (violin, viola, cello)

Sinfonia à la Leopold (string orchestra)

Six Voluntaries (organ/piano/harpsichord)

Sonata Romanesca (violin/viola/cello and keyboard)

Suite Antica (versions for string trio, solo and keyboard, guitar and harp)

Arioso (keyboard)

Missa Semplice à la Palestrina (SAB)

See also

 University of Newcastle (NSW)
 Australian Broadcasting Corporation

References

External links
 European Medical Students Orchestra
 Conservatorium of Newcastle

Australian conductors (music)
Australian surgeons
Living people
1968 births
21st-century conductors (music)